Cory Nicholas Harkey (born June 17, 1990) is a former American football tight end and coach who is the assistant special teams coach for the Buffalo Bills of the National Football League (NFL). He was signed by the St. Louis Rams as an undrafted free agent in 2012 and played college football at UCLA. He is currently an assistant coach for the Buffalo Bills.

College career
After attending Chino Hills High School, he played college football at UCLA, and played in every game of his college career. He started seven games during his freshman season and was used primarily as a blocker, although he did have five catches for 40 yards and a touchdown. He once again was used almost exclusively as a blocker during his sophomore year, starting four games out of double tight-end formations, totaling eight receptions for 41 yards and a touchdown. During Harkey's junior year, he started every game for the Bruins, having his most productive year as a receiver. He finished fifth on the team in receptions, having 14 catches for 140 yards. Harkey once again started every game for the team during his senior year; however, he had only one reception for 10 yards. Following the season, the Bruins coaching staff awarded Harkey the Jerry Long "Heart" Award and Kenneth S. Washington Award for Outstanding Senior of the Year.

Professional career
Harkey was invited to the 2012 NFL Scouting Combine.

On May 8, 2012, he was signed by the Rams as an undrafted free agent. At the conclusion of 2012 training camp, Harkey was released and placed on the Rams practice squad.  He was elevated to the active roster on November 17, 2012, taking the roster place of Kellen Heard, who had been released the previous week. Harkey dressed in his first game on the roster and was targeted once. He scored his first touchdown against the Houston Texans on October 13, 2013. 
Harkey has been frequently utilized as a fullback with the Rams.

In March 2015, Harkey signed a one-year restricted free-agent tender offer.

Harkey was placed on injured reserve on December 13, 2016, with a triceps injury. 
On September 2, 2017, Harkey was released by the Rams.

Personal life
Harkey is the son of former Major League Baseball player Mike Harkey, who is currently the bullpen coach for the New York Yankees. He says that former Kansas City Chiefs and Atlanta Falcons tight end Tony Gonzalez is his biggest inspiration as a player.

References

External links
 Tennessee State profile
 Azusa Pacific profile
 Los Angeles Rams profile
 UCLA profile

1990 births
Living people
American football tight ends
Azusa Pacific Cougars football coaches
Los Angeles Rams players
St. Louis Rams players
Tennessee State Tigers football coaches
UCLA Bruins football players
Chino Hills High School alumni
Sportspeople from Chicago
People from Chino Hills, California
Coaches of American football from California
Players of American football from California
Players of American football from Chicago
African-American coaches of American football
African-American players of American football
21st-century African-American sportspeople
Buffalo Bills coaches